Haqeeqat is a 1985 Hindi-language political action film, produced by Vijay Soorma and Rajeev Kumar under the Vidya Shree Films banner and directed by T. Rama Rao. It stars Jeetendra, Jaya Prada in the pivotal roles and music composed by Bappi Lahiri. The film is remake of the Telugu movie Neti Bharatam (1983), starring Suman, Vijayashanti in the pivotal roles.

Plot
Inspector Arjun Singh a sincere & sheer cop, newly arrives in the town. Immediately, he spots the city polluted with corruption, extortion, prostitution, black marketing, racism, etc. He learns these violations are conducted under the garb of a venomous politician MP Azghar Pandey associating with an Advocate Kapoor, SP Suraj Pal Singh, and Dr. Mathur. Arjun gallantly challenges them, aids & benefits the labor and befriends their leader Amar.

During that process, Arjun meets a woman Lanka Lakshmi Bai who runs a brothel house and tries to change their path. Arjun goes into incredulity to watch his college mate Bharti, wife of his friend Uma Shankar Baghi therein. Then, he discovers after their wedding, Uma Shankar acquired a job, following him, Bharti proceeded. Whereby, she was trapped and dragged into this profession. Now, Arjun approaches Uma Shankar and he denies Bharti. Hence, she spits on him and quits when Arjun shelters her. Yet, Bharti has to face several humiliations, so, Arjun marries her to provide her legitimacy. Parallelly, he reforms Lakshmi Bai relieves all the women from the hoods of prostitution, and establishes an Ashram.

Meanwhile, Azghar Pandey plots to occupy the labor colony when Arjun hinders it. Thus, infuriated Azghar Pandey sets fire to it which leads to the death of several people. Arjun collects the pieces of evidence against the knaves when they abduct pregnant Bharti. Accordingly, she realizes them as the same who ruined her life. At once, Arjun encounters them but he is badly injured. However, he succeeds in reaching the hospital along with Bharti where blackguards intrigue him to kill. Knowing it, Bharti flares up and eliminates the demons. Arjun claims her deed as inadmissible and asks her to surrender which she does so. At last, the judiciary acquits Bharti as guiltless. Finally, the movie ends on a happy note with the reunion of Arjun & Bharti.

Cast

 Jeetendra as Inspector Arjun
 Jaya Prada as Bharti
 Raj Babbar as Amar
 Swapna as Kusum
 Bindu as Laxmi
 Prem Chopra as Ajgar Pandey
 Sujit Kumar as SP Surajpal Singh
 Om Shivpuri as Dr. Mathur
 Bharat Kapoor as Ajgar's Advocate
 Asrani as Constable Mahipal Singh
 Nilu Phule as Kusum's Father
 Dulari as Amar's Mother
 Beena Banerjee as Sharda
 Chandrashekhar as Police Inspector 
 Pinchoo Kapoor as Employment Exchange Officer
 Viju Khote as Hospital Ward Boy, Guest Role

Soundtrack
Lyrics: Indeevar

References

External links

1980s Hindi-language films
1985 films
Films directed by T. Rama Rao
Films scored by Bappi Lahiri
Hindi remakes of Telugu films